The 1990–91 season was the 45th season in FK Partizan's existence. This article shows player statistics and matches that the club played during the 1990–91 season.

Players

Squad information

Competitions

Yugoslav First League

Yugoslav Cup

UEFA Cup

First round

Second round

Third round

See also
 List of FK Partizan seasons

Notes

References

External links
 Official website
 Partizanopedia 1990-91  (in Serbian)

FK Partizan seasons
Partizan